River of Time is the fourteenth studio album by American singer-songwriter Michael Martin Murphey. The album contains a newly recorded version of "What Am I Doing Hangin' 'Round?" and a duet with his son, Ryan Murphey, on "Talkin' to the Wrong Man" which reached number 4 on the Billboard Hot Country Singles chart in July 1988 and number 1 on the RPM Country Singles chart in Canada. River of Time peaked at number 11 on the Billboard Top Country Albums chart.

Track listing

Personnel
Music
 Michael Martin Murphey – lead vocals
 Steve Gibson – acoustic guitar, electric guitar
 Larry Byrom – acoustic guitar
 Mark Casstevens – acoustic guitar
 Paul Franklin – steel guitar
 Jerry Douglas – dobro
 Mark O'Connor – fiddle
 Mike Lawler – synthesizer
 Charlie McCoy – harmonica
 Gove Scrivenor – autoharp
 Dennis Burnside – keyboards, string arrangements on “I’m Gonna Miss You, Girl”
 David Hoffner – synthesizer
 Michael Rhodes – bass guitar
 Mike Brignardello – bass guitar
 James Stroud – drums
 Eddie Bayers – drums
 Monroe Jones – drum programming on “Pilgrims on the Way”
 Ryan Murphey – duet vocals on "Talkin' to the Wrong Man"
 Wayne Kirkpatrick – background vocals
 Chris Harris – backing vocals
 Gary Janney – backing vocals
 Take 6 – backing vocals
 Dennis Wilson – backing vocals
 Dan Keen – backing vocals
 The Nashville String Machine - strings on “I’m Gonna Miss You, Girl”

Production
 Ken Suesov – engineer
 Bruce Albertine – engineer
 Lee Groitasch – assistant engineer
 Carry Summers – assistant engineer
 Bob Wright – assistant engineer
 Marshall Morgan – engineer, mixing
 Denny Purcell – mastering
 Charles Collins – artwork, photography

Chart performance

References

External links
 Michael Martin Murphey's Official Website

1988 albums
Michael Martin Murphey albums
Warner Records albums